Ax-les-Thermes (or ) is a commune in the Ariège department in the Occitanie region of south-western France.

The inhabitants of the commune are known as Axéens or Axéennes.

The commune has been awarded one flower by the National Council of Towns and Villages in Bloom in the Competition of cities and villages in Bloom.

Geography

Ax-les-Thermes is situated in the Pyrénées, close to Andorra, and stands on the confluence of the Oriège, Ariège and Lauze rivers. some 75 km west of Perpignan and 35 km north-east of Andorra la Vella. Access to the commune is by Route nationale N20 from Garanou in the north-west which passes through the village then south through the commune to Mérens-les-Vals. The D613 goes north from the village to Sorgeat and the D25 branches from this to go east to Ascou and Mijanès. The railway line from Foix passes through the commune with Ax-les-Thermes station just north-west of the village. The line continues south to Merens-les-Vals. Apart from the village there are the hamlets of Premiere Bazerque, Deuxieme Bazerque, Troisieme Bazerque, Petches, and Ax-Bonascre to the south. The Ax 3 Domaines Ski resort is located at Ax-Bonascre south-west of the village and is accessed by the D82 road from the village. The commune is alpine in nature with extensive forests and rugged terrain.

The Ariège river flows through the commune from south to north at the start of its journey to join the Garonne at Portet-sur-Garonne. The Ruisseau des Estagnols rises in the south of the commune and flows north to join the Ariège in the south of the commune. The Ruisseau de Risl and the Ruisseau de Font Frède both rise in the east of the commune and flow west to join the Ariège. The Oriège flows from the east to join the Ariège in the village and the Lauze flows from the east to join the Ariège just north of the confluence of the Oriège.

The Spa
The waters, which were used by the Romans, were historically claimed to treat rheumatism, skin diseases, and other maladies. The springs were developed in the medieval period on the orders of Saint Louis to treat soldiers returning from the Crusades afflicted with leprosy. From the 19th century, a spa tourism industry developed.

The Bassin des Ladres (Lepers' Pond), in the centre of the commune, is fed by hot springs supplying water from the ground at a temperature of 77 °C. The best known fountain is the "fountain of cannons". A hospital is situated only one metre from the basin. The pond was built by Roger IV, Count of Foix, during the reign of Saint Louis in 1260. Every year on St John's Day the people of Ax-les-Thermes, having been daubed with ashes, bathe in the Lepers' Pond for fun.

History

Heraldry

Administration

List of Successive Mayors

Demography
In 2017 the commune had 1,267 inhabitants.

Economy

Local economic activity is based mainly on livestock (cattle and sheep), Hydrotherapy (there are 60 sources at temperatures ranging from 18 to 78 °C, feeding three spas: Couloubret, Modèle, and Teich. The waters treat especially sciatica, rheumatism and certain respiratory diseases), winter sports, and tourism in general. Its proximity to Andorra enables cross-border shopping. The Ax 3 Domaines winter sports resort is situated in the commune and served as the finish line for stage 14 of the 2010 Tour de France.

Culture and heritage

Civil heritage
The commune has two sites that are registered as historical monuments:
The Bassin des Ladres (Leper's Pond) (13th century) is fed by hot spring water at a temperature of 77 °C. 
The Teich Park Ornamental Garden (1838)

Picture Gallery

Religious heritage
The Church of Saint-Jerome (formerly the Chapel of the Blue Penitents) contains several items that are registered as historical objects:
An Altar Painting: Christ on the Cross (1841)
The Choir Enclosure (18th century)
The Front of the Altar (18th century)
A Tabernacle and 6 statuettes (18th century)
The Altar, Retable, 2 statues, Painting: Saint Jerome, Saint Madeleine, Christ on the Cross (18th century)
The Church of Saint-Vincent contains several items that are registered as historical objects:
A Chalice (16th century)
A Crucifix from the Blue Penitents (1650)
A Chalice (16th century)
A Painting: Saint Vincent in Ecstasy (18th century)
A Bronze Bell (1512)
A Painting: The mystical marriage of Saint Catherine (17th century)
A Painting: Christ on the Cross with Saint Madeleine and the Virgin at his feet (1875)

Notable people linked to the commune 
Saint Udaut (405-452), priest and martyr
Peire Autier, Albigensian leader
Louis Gareau (1769-1813), General of the Armies of the Republic and the Empire
Gatien Marcailhou (1807-1855), composer and "inventor" of the waltz. He was the first teacher of Gabriel Fauré. His most famous composition, Indiana, inspired Camille Claudel in his group La Valse.
Pierre Bertrand de Mérignon
Pierre Roussel (1742-1802), writer and doctor, born in Ax-les-Thermes.

See also
Communes of the Ariège department

References

External links

Ax-les-Thermes official website 
Vallées d'Ax Tourism website 
Tourist Information website for Ax les Thermes 
Ax 3 Domaines ski resort official website 
Ax-les-Thermes Green Station website 
Ax-les-Thermes school website 
Ax on the 1750 Cassini Map

Communes of Ariège (department)
Spa towns in France